The 2010 Phillips 66 Big 12 Men's Basketball Championship was the 2010 edition of the Big 12 Conference's championship tournament held at Sprint Center in Kansas City, Missouri from March 10 until March 13, 2010.  It was won by top-seeded Kansas.  The all-tournament team consisted of Kansas' Sherron Collins and Cole Aldrich, Kansas State's Jacob Pullen and Denis Clemente, and Texas A&M's Donald Sloan.

Seeding
The Tournament consisted of a 12 team single-elimination tournament with the top 4 seeds receiving a bye.

Schedule

Tournament bracket

Asterisk denotes game ended in overtime.
Rankings reflect AP Poll for the week of 3/8/2010.

All-Tournament Team
Most Outstanding Player – Sherron Collins, Kansas

See also
2010 Big 12 Conference women's basketball tournament
2010 NCAA Division I men's basketball tournament
2009–10 NCAA Division I men's basketball rankings

References

External links
Official 2010 Big 12 Men's Basketball Tournament Bracket

Tournament
Big 12 men's basketball tournament
Big 12 men's basketball tournament
Big 12 men's basketball tournament
College sports tournaments in Missouri